is a Japanese jazz pianist, keyboardist, composer and arranger.

Early life
Kikuchi was born in Sendai, Miyagi Prefecture, on March 2, 1953. Raised in Shiogama, she began studying classical piano at the age of 7, under the tutelage of Ruiko Koga of Miyagi Gakuin Women's University's Music Department, and Tokyo University of the Arts Professor Takako Horie. When she was 12 years old, she won second prize at the Yamaha Electone Competition for her performance of Johann Sebastian Bach's Toccata and Fugue in D minor.

Music career
After performing with such vocalists and musicians as Takuro Yoshida, Tsunehiko Kamijō, and Mayumi Itsuwa, Kikuchi began studying under jazz pianist Sadayasu Fujii around 1975. On July 11, 1979, Kikuchi was the keyboardist for Bingo Miki & the Inner Galaxy Orchestra during their set at Montreux Jazz Festival in Switzerland.

In 1980, Kikuchi released her debut studio album, Don't Be Stupid, through the Teichiku Records sublabel Continental. The following year, she arranged the tracks for the 1981 album Cool "C" by American musician Richie Cole. Her next albums, Flashing (1981), All Right (1982), Woman (1983), and Reverse It (1984), were all issued by Continental. Kikuchi's 1987 album Flying Beagle and 1988 album Sevilla Breeze were released by CBS/Sony Records. Kikuchi composed the music for the 1993 film Yakuza Ladies Revisited 2; her album Beam, released through RCA Records, serves as the film's soundtrack.

In 2002, Kikuchi served as music director and led an orchestra at the 17th National Cultural Festival, held in Tottori Prefecture. In 2005, she performed "Furusato - Home in My Soul" at the opening ceremony of the 17th National Lifelong Learning Festival, held in the same prefecture. That same year, she received the 30th Tottori City Cultural Award.

Personal life
Kikuchi is married to guitarist Masatsugu Matsumoto. She moved to Tottori with him in 1999.

References

1953 births
Japanese jazz composers
Japanese jazz pianists
Japanese women pianists
Japanese women composers
Living people
People from Sendai
Women jazz composers
Women jazz pianists